The pale-vented thrush (Turdus obsoletus) is a species of bird in the family Turdidae.

It is found in Colombia, Costa Rica, Ecuador, Panama, and Peru. Its natural habitats are subtropical or tropical moist lowland forests, subtropical or tropical moist montane forests, and heavily degraded former forest.

References

pale-vented thrush
Birds of Costa Rica
Birds of Panama
Birds of Colombia
Birds of the Tumbes-Chocó-Magdalena
pale-vented thrush
Taxonomy articles created by Polbot